Cantando is a 1982 jazz album by Bobo Swenson.

Cantando may also refer to:

Music
Cantando, 1984 album by Diomedes Díaz
Cantando, 1991 album by Cheo Feliciano
Cantando, 2004 album by Toto Cutugno 
Cantando, 2016 EP by Dom La Nena

Television
Cantando 2011, the third season of Cantando por un Sueño
Cantando 2012, the fourth season of Cantando por un Sueño

See also
Cantabile, a particular style of playing designed to imitate the human voice